Galloping Ghost Arcade is a video arcade located on Ogden Avenue in Brookfield, Illinois (a suburb of Chicago). It opened on August 13, 2010, and as of January 2022, contains over 851 arcade games, up from 130 at the time of opening, across 7,500+ square feet, making it the largest classic video arcade in the United States. As of October 2020, the establishment is owned by co-founder Doc Mack.

History
The idea of starting an arcade came to co-founder Doc Mack in the 1990s while he was a clerk at a Babbage's. After a chance encounter with Mortal Kombat co-creator Ed Boon, Mack used that meeting to pursue a career in the games industry. Mack opened Galloping Ghost Arcade in 2010.

In 2020, Galloping Ghost secured a rare Sega R360 arcade cabinet, one of only 150 such cabinets that were ever made.

References

Video arcades
2010 establishments in Illinois
Brookfield, Illinois
Companies based in Cook County, Illinois